Patrick Hasenhüttl (born 20 May 1997) is an Austrian professional footballer who plays as a centre-forward for VfB Oldenburg on loan from Austria Klagenfurt. He previously played senior football for Ingolstadt 04 II, Türkgücü München and SpVgg Unterhaching. Hasenhüttl has played for Austria at under-17, under-18 level and under-19 levels.

Club career
Hasenhüttl played youth football for SpVgg Unterhaching before joining the youth team of VfB Stuttgart in 2013. He left VfB Stuttgart's youth team in 2015 and joined Ingolstadt 04. He made his senior debut for Ingolstadt 04's reserve side on 30 July 2016 as a substitute in a 3–1 defeat away to VfR Garching. On 2 September 2016, he scored the first goal of his senior career with his first touch after coming on as a substitute in a 2–2 draw away to 1. FC Schweinfurt 05. He made a total of 82 league appearances, in which he scored 23 goals, over three seasons with Ingolstadt 04 II.

In June 2019, he signed for Regionalliga Bayern side Türkgücü München on a free transfer. He scored 14 goals in 23 league appearances for Türkgücü München across the 2019–20 season, as they were promoted to the 3. Liga during the COVID-19 pandemic.

He returned to former youth club SpVgg Unterhaching in the summer of 2020 on a two-year contract. Hasenhüttl made his debut for the club in the 3. Liga on 25 September 2020, starting in a 1–0 home victory against VfB Lübeck.

In January 2022, Hasenhüttl signed a 2.5-year contract with Austria Klagenfurt.

He was loaned to 3. Liga club VfB Oldenburg in September 2022.

International career
Hasenhüttl has represented Austria internationally at under-17 level, under-18 level and under-19 levels. He appeared for Austria at the 2016 UEFA European Under-19 Championship.

Personal life
He is the son of former professional footballer and former Southampton and RB Leipzig manager Ralph Hasenhüttl. He was born in Mechelen, Belgium as his father was playing for KV Mechelen at the time, but has represented Austria in youth international football. He also holds German citizenship.

References

External links
 
 
 
 
 Patrick Hasenhüttl at Austrian Football Association

1997 births
Living people
Sportspeople from Mechelen
Footballers from Antwerp Province
Austrian footballers
Austria youth international footballers
Belgian footballers
Belgian people of Austrian descent
German footballers
Association football forwards
FC Ingolstadt 04 II players
Türkgücü München players
SpVgg Unterhaching players
SK Austria Klagenfurt players
VfB Oldenburg players
3. Liga players
Regionalliga players